Weyni Mengesha is a Canadian film and theatre director, based in Toronto, Ontario.  She is known as the director of the plays da kink in my hair, and Kim's Convenience.

Mengesha married American actor Eion Bailey in 2011. The couple have two children.

In 2018, she was hired as the artistic director of the Soulpepper Theatre.  Observers applauded her appointment, and that of her colleague Executive director Emma Stenning, as it meant the two senior posts at the theatre would be filled by women, after the previous male director Albert Schultz resigned after actors accused him of preying on female subordinates.

Mengesha's parents were immigrants from Ethiopia. She is the cousin of actor Araya Mengesha. While she was born in Vancouver, Mengesha grew up in Scarborough, Ontario.  She graduated from Soulpepper Academy. Mengesha has been nominated for the Dora Mavor Moore Award five times, winning the award in 2014.

Mengesha co-signed a letter of support to the Black Lives Matter movement, in June 2020, following several high profile incidents where police killed black civilians, in both the United States and Canada.

References

External links

Canadian theatre directors
Women theatre directors
Year of birth missing (living people)
Living people
Black Canadian women
Black Canadian filmmakers
Film directors from Vancouver
Film directors from Toronto
Canadian women film directors